The Marquette University College of Business Administration is one of the primary colleges at Marquette University, located in Milwaukee, Wisconsin, with additional off-campus graduate classrooms in Waukesha and Kohler, Wisconsin.

History 
The College of Business Administration was founded in 1910 as simply the School of Economics, and obtained its current status as a college in 1923. Forty-three years later, in 1953, the college offered its first graduate school classes. The graduate programs were spun off into the Marquette University Graduate School of Management in 2006. In 2008, the alumni base of the college topped 20,000 graduates worldwide.

Programs and reputation
The College of Business Administration offers bachelor's, master's and executive master's degrees as well as dual-degree programs in conjunction with other schools such as law.  The college is divided between five academic departments: Accounting, Economics, Finance, Management, and Marketing.

In 2012, U.S. News & World Report ranked Marquette's executive MBA and part-time MBA programs in the top 20 and top 50 in the nation, respectively. The same set of rankings placed Marquette's overall undergraduate business ranking at 81st nationally. The undergraduate programs in entrepreneurship, finance and supply chain management were among the top business specialty programs, coming in at 16th, 18th and 16th, respectively.

References

External links
 Marquette University

Marquette University
Business schools in Wisconsin